The Pythian Building, completed in 1907, is a Masonic building in Portland, Oregon.

External links
 
 Pythian Building at Emporis

1907 establishments in Oregon
Buildings and structures completed in 1907
Buildings and structures in Portland, Oregon
Masonic buildings in Oregon
Southwest Portland, Oregon
Knights of Pythias buildings